Beth Levin may refer to:

 Beth Levin (linguist) (born 1955), American linguist
 Beth Levin (musician) (born 1950), American pianist